The College of Visual Arts (CVA) in Saint Paul, Minnesota, United States, was a private, accredited, four-year college of art and design offering a Bachelor of Fine Arts degree in fine arts, graphic design, illustration, and photography. The fine arts degree offered concentrations in drawing, painting, printmaking, and sculpture.

CVA began as one of the first learning environments in the Twin Cities specifically designed to ignite the creativity of artists and designers.  CVA was one of a handful of art and design colleges in the U.S. that provided an arts education steeped in the liberal arts.  With an enrollment of approximately 200 students and a faculty of 50, CVA offered a low student-teacher ratio.  The college was one of only two private art and design colleges in Minnesota. The college announced in January 2013 that its doors would be closing forever effective in June. President Ann Ledy resigned on January 23, 2013, and Dr. Susan Short served as Acting President until the college closed on June 30, 2013.

History
In 1948 Lowell Bobleter acquired Mills College of Art and Advertising and transformed it into what would become the College of Visual Arts. Bobleter, a prominent Saint Paul artist and educator then serving as chairman of the fine arts department at Hamline University, based the new curriculum on the Bauhaus model: an integrated program including both fine and applied arts, and general courses in the humanities, natural sciences, and aesthetics. As president, Bobleter renamed the institution the School of Associated Arts (SAA). In 1969 the school assumed non-profit status. During the 1970s the school achieved national accreditation with the National Association of Trade and Technical Schools (NATTS) and began to participate in federal financial aid programs. In 1989 the college changed its name to the College of Associated Arts and began the process of seeking accreditation from the Higher Learning Commission of the North Central Association of Colleges and Schools (HLC). To clarify that the college was a four-year institution, the administration adopted the name "College of Visual Arts" (CVA) in 1995. CVA was granted candidacy status by HLC in August 1994, and was granted full accreditation in 1998. In October 2011, CVA also acquired accreditation by the National Association of Schools of Art and Design (NASAD). In January 2013, CVA announced that it would be closing its doors forever effective in June of that year.

Campus
The campus was located in Saint Paul's historic Ramsey Hill and Summit Avenue neighborhoods and comprised five buildings: the 1915 Watson P. Davidson House on Summit Avenue (which housed administrative offices, classrooms, computer labs, and printmaking and sculpture studios); a public gallery at Selby and Western avenues; and three buildings near the gallery that housed the library, additional classrooms and studios, and a photography lab.

Mission
The College of Visual Arts provides a collaborative environment that focuses on individual student development by fully integrating the study of the liberal arts and the visual arts. We cultivate a worldview that recognizes the value of art and design in promoting pride in place and responsible citizenship.

Academic program
All first year students participate in a clearly sequenced yearlong foundation program consisting of a strong standardized curriculum in studio arts, liberal arts, and an orientation to art and design. It provides a required introduction to the essential visual vocabulary, concepts, and technical skills necessary for success in all the upper level programs. This program provides all first year students with the information necessary to make an informed choice of major at its conclusion.

What students learn in the first year, and expand upon in courses in their major, culminates in the Senior Thesis Program. Thesis work includes the development of a mature body of studio work for exhibition and a written analysis of the student's collection, a professional portfolio, website, and opportunities to develop presentations for public address. This program also equips students with career-focused skills and experience—from interviewing for art and design positions, teaching, and applying for public commissions to writing grant proposals, launching and promoting a freelance business, and applying for graduate school.
	
Integration of liberal arts coursework in all of the art and design majors is a distinguishing feature of the College of Visual Arts; CVA offers a robust selection of liberal arts courses to enhance the student's learning experience. Extensive study in art history helps the students understand their own work in the context of the larger world of art and design. Active learning through the arts is employed in many areas such as math and science courses. Oral presentation and critical reading, thinking, and writing are important skills across the curriculum.

Notable alumni and faculty
 Terry Redlin (1958)
 Michael Birawer (1993)
 Lynda Monick-Isenberg, Professor of Fine Arts and Foundation Studies Chair
 Valerie Jenkins, Associate Professor and Fine Arts Chair
 Jesse Draxler (2007)
 Jane Wunrow (2007)

See also

 List of colleges and universities in Minnesota
 Higher education in Minnesota

References

 St. Paul: College of Visual Arts alumni, supporters give up fight to save school Pioneer Press
 Board of trustees to discuss rescue plan for St. Paul arts college Star Tribune
 CVA supporters urge board for a second chance Minnesota Public Radio
 Group has plan to keep St. Paul College of Visual Arts open Pioneer Press
 Art school supporters seeking reprieve for St. Paul college Star Tribune
 College of Visual Arts in St. Paul faces questions as president abruptly quits Star Tribune
 St. Paul's College of Visual Arts students, alumni seek to save school Pioneer Press
 Can St. Paul's College of Visual Arts be saved? Twin Cities Daily Planet

External links
CVA website
MN Office of Higher Education website

1948 establishments in Minnesota
2013 disestablishments in Minnesota
Art schools in Minnesota
Educational institutions established in 1948
Educational institutions disestablished in 2013
Private universities and colleges in Minnesota
Universities and colleges in Saint Paul, Minnesota